10th Reconnaissance Squadron may refer to:
 The 89th Tactical Missile Squadron, designated the 10th Reconnaissance Squadron (Light) from January 1941 to August 1941
 The 400th Missile Squadron, designated the 10th Reconnaissance Squadron (Heavy) for seven days in April 1942
 The 910th Air Refueling Squadron, designated the 10th Reconnaissance Squadron (Fighter) from April 1943 to August 1943
 The 10th Intelligence Squadron, designated the 10th Reconnaissance Squadron, Very Long Range (Photographic) from December 1945 to March 1946, and 10th Reconnaissance Squadron, Photographic from November 1947 to June 1949

See also 
 The 10th Photographic Reconnaissance Squadron
 The 10th Strategic Reconnaissance Squadron
 The 10th Tactical Reconnaissance Squadron, so designated from August 1943 to March 1946 
 The 10th Tactical Reconnaissance Squadron, so designated from June 1949 to January 1950